Flowery Field Cricket Club is located in the Flowery Field area of Hyde, Greater Manchester and was formed in 1838. It celebrated its sesquicentennial year in 1988 with a number of special matches.

The club runs three senior teams together with several junior sides and has modern facilities including an air-conditioned pavilion and enclosed practice nets.

FFCC was a member of the Saddleworth and District Cricket League for most of the twentieth century but resigned as reigning champions in 2003 to join the Lancashire County League.

In their first season in the Lancashire County League they finished 7th and in their second season in 2005 they reached the final of the Walkden Cup which they lost to Denton St Lawrence whilst also finishing 4th in the League to qualify for the Lancashire Cup in season 2006.  In the first round of the competition they were drawn against Bootle Cricket Club and lost a close match against a strong Merseyside team including former England batsman Graham Lloyd.

For season 2008 their professional was all-rounder Andrew Gleave and he replaced left-arm spin bowler Damien Eyre who was paid man from 2005 to 2007.  In 2009 Gleave was replaced by fast bowler Stephen Oddy from Rochdale who completed his fourth season as paid man in 2012 with his replacement for 2013 being experienced all rounder Ghulam Abbas. By 2015 their professional was Australian batsman Liam Castellas.  Previous professionals have included South Australian state batsman Robert Zadow, former Lancashire and Somerset all-rounder Andrew Payne and South African international Steve Elworthy.

For 2016 FFCC joined the newly created Greater Manchester Cricket League with their professional then being Sean Gibson an off-spinning all-rounder with the position taken for 2017 by fast bowler Mike Burns from Littleborough.

Cricket clubs established in 1838
English club cricket teams
Sport in Tameside
1838 establishments in England
Cricket in Greater Manchester
Hyde, Greater Manchester
Organisations based in Tameside